Squadron Leader Khalid Khawaja (1951–2010) was an officer of the Pakistan Air Force, and the Air Force's intelligence officer of the Pakistan's Inter Services Intelligence agency.
A former member of Special Service Wing (SSW) and a veteran of Soviet–Afghan War, Khawaja described himself as a close associate of Osama bin Laden in the early days of the Afghan resistance against the Soviet Union. He was once suspected of being involved in the murder of American reporter Daniel Pearl. This was later proved to be false, but he did connect Pearl with men who would eventually kill him.

Military career
Khawaja gained commission in Pakistan Air Force in January 1971. He completed his aviation training to become an aviator of Alouette III, and was selected to be sent to PAF Special Warfare School. After his graduation in JUNE 1973, Khawaja as flying officer, was selected  as a flight specialist. Squadron Leader Khawaja actively participated in Soviet–Afghan War along with elite Black Storks, also known as Special Service Group. In 1985, Squadron Leader Khawaja pursued his career to become an intelligence officer. After passing the selection exam, Khawaja joined ISI where he actively participated in Soviet–Afghan War. In 1987, former President and Chief of Army Staff General Zia-ul-Haq dismissed him from his position for his "outspoken views", a  subsequent forced-retirement given by the Pakistan's Judge Advocate General Branch in 1987.

Asia Times comments

A November 9, 2005, article in the Asia Times described Khawaja as the "point man" for Mansoor Ijaz, which it describes as "...a US citizen of Pakistani origin with close ties to the right wing of the Republican Party". The Asia Times says that Ijaz is negotiating a peace with the remaining elements of the Taliban, with Khawaja's assistance. The Associated Press names Khawaja a spokesman for a Pakistani human rights group named Defense of Human Rights.

Activism
Khawaja was a close friend of Abdul Rashid Ghazi. and briefly served the role of Ghazi's press attache.

Khawaja and Ghazi later on founded Defence of Human Rights Pakistan in 2005 alongside Amina Masood Janjua.

Friend of Khadr family
A noted friend of the Egyptian-Canadian Khadr family, Khawaja spoke in their defence saying they were being unfairly targeted by Canadian authorities because of deference to the United States, and Islamophobia. He has also said that Canada is "selfish and self-centred" and deserves to be bombed by terrorists.

Deborah Scroggins, author of the book Wanted Women, describes meeting Zaynab while she was a house-guest of Khawaja, in Islamabad, Pakistan, in 2004.

Arrest
Khawaja was arrested in Aabpara on January 26, 2007, on charges of distributing hate material (Section 295A of the Pakistan Penal Code), which he denied.

Death
He was found dead in Mir Ali on April 30, 2010 – a month after being kidnapped by a group calling themselves the "Asian Tigers", while filming a documentary about Colonel Imam. Imam, British journalist Asad Qureshi and Qureshi's driver Rustam Khan were also kidnapped with Khawaja. Qureshi and Khan were released in September 2010. Imam was killed in January 2011.

References

1951 births
2010 deaths
Kidnapped Pakistani people
Pakistani murder victims
Deaths by firearm in Pakistan
Military personnel killed in the insurgency in Khyber Pakhtunkhwa
Members of the special forces units of Pakistan
Pakistan Air Force officers
People from Jaranwala
People from Islamabad
People of Inter-Services Intelligence